Keith Jennings may refer to:
Keith Jennings (footballer) (born 1977), Bermudian international soccer player
Keith Jennings (basketball) (born 1968), American basketball coach and former basketball player
Keith Jennings (cricketer) (born 1953), English cricketer
Keith Jennings (American football) (born 1966), former American football tight end
Keith R. Jennings (born 1932), British chemist
Keith Jennings (tennis), American former tennis player, 1966 U.S. National Championships – Men's Singles